

Films

Episodic compilations

Box sets

Interactive DVDs

References

Bratz
Bratz